Gruta de Maquiné (MG-0243) (English: Maquiné Grotto), also Lapa Nova de Maquiné, is the oldest and one of the most commercially visited caves in Brazil. Safety measures like lighting, walkways and handrails allow a multitude of visitors to enjoy safely the wonders of the grotto where the whole journey is accompanied by an experienced local guide.

Description

Geography
The main element of its formation is calcium carbonate, presenting also other minerals such as silica, gypsum, quartz and iron. Its galleries and halls, true architectural oddities, are the result of the formidable job of water in the persistence of millennia.

Morphology
The grotto features beautiful morphology due to its wide halls and aesthetic value due to their speleothematic beauty, in addition to its scientific value as it must have accommodated a considerable volume of water in the past.
 First chamber, called "Vestibulo" ("Entrance Hall"), is fully illuminated by the natural light coming from the entrance of the cave. It measures  in length,  in width and contains numerous stalagmites that rise from the ground. The most distant of them are heaped in a single group that rises up to the upper dome, forming a back wall where two large blocks of quartz detach from the huge layer of the same mineral.
Masses of stalagmites that rise up to the dome link this wall to that which separates the preceding chamber. Other masses have risen as the first, leaving only a descent. The layer of stalagmites here formed was punctured so that the nitrogenous component contained therein might be extracted. This layer contains a large quantity of small bones and teeth.
It distinguishes itself from all the other chambers mostly because the ground is covered with gypsum powder. Noticeable also in this room, besides the figure of a lamb, is the imposing figure of a gigantic mushroom.
Large masses of stalagmites resembling ancient statues in a Roman bath adorn the opposite edges of the basin.
In this room bones of large animals, including the remains of a mammoth have been found. In the background of this chamber there is a passage to another room and a limpid cascade which has condensed itself into bright alabaster. The whole chamber and all the figures existing in it are decorated with a delicate crust of crystals of calcium carbonate, sometimes of the purest white, sometimes differently colored. The splendid reflections produced by the light illuminating the many facets of this crystal, dazzle the eye of those who gaze at this imagery and with it, see themselves transported to a fairy-like palace. Dr. Lund said: "My eyes have never seen anything more beautiful and magnificent in the domains of nature and art."
 Seventh chamber is divided into two parts. The first one is referred to as "Salão do Dr. Lund" ("Dr. Lund's Hall"), and is considered the most important of the chambers by the amount of bones that it contains. It is 42 meters long, 22 meters wide and 15 meters high. It leads downwards and forms many watersheds along the way. In the middle of the chamber there is a 60-centimeter-wide by 4.5-meter-deep coverage through which all excess of water is drained out of the cave. The second chamber is called "Salão do Cemitério" ("Cemetery Hall"), which is the largest of the chambers in the cave measuring 162.5 meters long by 56 meters wide. It is coated with a crumbly layer of plaster powder stalagmites which covers the ground, piling up to the ceiling.

Paleontology
Considered as the "cradle" of paleontology in the country, the grotto was discovered in 1825 by farmer Joaquim Maria Maquiné, then the landowner. It is widely known for its paleontological importance detected initially by Peter Claussen and the Danish naturalist Peter Wilhelm Lund who scientifically first explored it in 1834. Dr. Lund remained inside the cave nearly two years doing his research on the Brazilian paleontology, describing all the chambers, explaining the formation of stalagmites and stalactites and examining human remains and petrifaction of animals from the Quaternary period. Among others, he found fossilized skeletons of birds with an extraordinary curvature of up to three meters and the Nothrotherium maquinense, the smallest and most emblematic of the terrestrial sloths which he found in 1835 when he first explored the cave.

In 1868, after more than 30 years after the exploration of the cave, Lund wished to return to Cordisburgo and show the Duke of Saxe who visited the country, the natural beauty of this huge cave.

See also 
 List of caves in Brazil

References 

Attribution
 This article is based on the translation of the corresponding article of the Portuguese Wikipedia. A list of contributors can be found there at the History section.

External links 
 Cavernas do Brasil - Gruta de Maquiné  at Sociedade Brasileira de Espeleologia Website

Limestone caves
Show caves in Brazil
Caves of Minas Gerais
Tourist attractions in Minas Gerais